Shughnon Range  or Shugnan Range is a mountain range in Tajikistan, part of the Pamir Mountain System. Administratively it is located in Tajikistan's Region of Republican Subordination.

Geography
The Shughnon Range stretches between the river valleys of the Gunt in the north and its tributary the Shakhdara in the south. Its slopes are covered in alpine meadows and steppe. There are glaciated areas in the range.

Its highest summit is 5,704 m high Pik Skalisty.

See also
List of mountains in Tajikistan

References

Mountain ranges of Tajikistan
Districts of Republican Subordination
Pamir Mountains